A Fantastical Meal is a 1900 French short silent trick film directed by Georges Méliès.

Plot 
Two women and a man, attempting to have dinner, find themselves confronted with magical happenings: the chairs move, the soup tureen grows, boots appear from it, the table legs change length, the table appears and reappears. A ghost, dancing on the table, turns into a box of dynamite and explodes, and the man begins tumbling manically around the room.

Release 
The film was released by Méliès's Star Film Company and is numbered 311 in its catalogues. It was imitated by Edwin S. Porter for the Edison Manufacturing Company film An Animated Luncheon.

References

External links
 

1900 films
French silent short films
French fantasy films
1900s fantasy films
Films directed by Georges Méliès
French black-and-white films
1900s French films